Árpád Ferenczy (1877-c. 1933) was a legal writer, law professor and Buddhist monk.

He studied law until 1901, later a librarian at the Parliamentary Library. From 1902 he taught law in Sárospatak. From 1903, he was a university professor at Kolozsvár and then from 1909 in Budapest. During his legal literary operation, he first wrote about international law. In his public work, he was a proponent of civil democracy, studying some English legal institutions. During World War I, he was a war correspondent in the Western Theater, then traveled to India and Ceylon. He came to Buddhist faith, and then he became a member of the Church as a monk.

Major works

Politics 
 A nemzetközi választott bíróságok múltja, jelenje és jövője (Bp., 1902)
 A politika rendszere. Alkotmány- és közigazgatástan (Bp., 1905)
 A semlegesség elmélete (Bp., 1907)
 Honosság, illetőség és lakóhely a nemzetközi magánjogban (Bp., 1908)
 Conflict of laws in Hungary. 
 A nemzetközi magánjog kézikönyve (Bp., 1911)
 Az angol parlamenti szólásjog és jegyelem történeti fejlődése és jelen állapota. 1547–1914 (Bp., 1914)

Eastern philosophy

Towards Nirvana 
 A bölcsesség iskolája (Légrády, 1918)
 Bráma éjszakája I-II. (Légrády, 1918)

Other writings 
 Timotheus Thümmel und seine Ameisen (Berlin, 1923)
 The Ants of Timothy Thummel (London, 1924) - English translation of book listed above
 Kunala, an Indian Fantasy (London, 1925)
 Revue philosophique
 Revue d'éconimie politique
 Archives d'anthropologie criminelle
– Descamps: Essai sur l'Organisation de l'arbitrage international

External links 
Ferenczy Árpád  at the Magyar Electronic Lexicon 
Ferenczy, Árpád  at the Encyclopedia of science fiction
The Ants of Timothy Thümmel at Merril Collection of Science Fiction, Fantasy & Speculation (Toronto Public Library)

References 

Hungarian journalists
Hungarian Buddhist monks
Hungarian legal scholars
Converts to Buddhism
Hungarian Buddhists
1877 births
1930s deaths